Oatley is a suburb in Southern Sydney in the state of New South Wales, Australia. Oatley lies in the local government area of Georges River Council. It lies on the northern side of the tidal estuary of the Georges River and its foreshore includes part of Oatley Bay and Lime Kiln Bay, and all of Neverfail Bay, Gungah Bay and Jewfish Bay.

History

Aboriginal history 
The area now known as Oatley lies either on the traditional lands of the Dharug people or the coastal  Eora people, both of whom spoke a common language. It lies close to the lands on the Tharawal on the south bank of the river.  Georges River Council acknowledges that the Biddegal/Bidjigal/Bedegal clan of the Eora are the original inhabitants and custodians of all land and water in the Georges River region.

Evidence of Aboriginal occupation of the land now known as Oatley exists in the form of numerous shell middens and rock shelters near the shore of Georges River. Lime Kiln Bay once had more extensive shell middens, made over centuries by local people; the bay gets its name from early settlers burning the shells to create lime.The kilns were located in what is now Oatley Park.

Settlement 
One of the earliest contacts between British settlers and Aboriginal people occurred on 20 January 1788, just to the west of Oatley.  Arthur Philip and Philip Gidley King, leading a party of seamen from the First Fleet rowing two open boats, explored the 'South-West Arm of Botany Bay' (now Georges River). They are now thought to have gone as far as Lime Kiln Bay, where they landed at two locations, thought to be just west of the boundaries of modern-day Oatley. Not finding enough freshwater, around Botany Bay and its two 'arms', the colonists moved on to Port Jackson, where the settlement of Sydney began six days later.

This suburb's name can be traced to James Oatley Snr, watch-maker, who was transported to Botany Bay for life in 1814. Seven years later, in 1821, Governor Lachlan Macquarie granted Oatley a conditional pardon and appointed him overseer of the Town Clock for his work in installing the clock at Hyde Park Barracks.

On 17 August 1898, Oatley was the site of a pursuit and gun battle involving a party of police and George Peisley (or Peasley), a fugitive cattle and horse thief, who was using a sandstone cave on the eastern side of Gungah Bay as his hide out. Peisley escaped capture, but was arrested at Arncliffe on the following day and eventually sentenced to four years hard labour.

The post office opened in 1903, thus giving the district its official name of Oatley. Prior to this, the area west of the railway line was officially in the suburb of Hurstville and attached to the Hurstville Post Office with "Oatley's" in parenthesis at the end of the address. Likewise, the streets east of the railway line were officially in the suburb of Kogarah and attached to the Kogarah Post Office. In the late 1890s both Hurstville and Kogarah were much larger suburbs and were later divided up into separate suburbs.

Oatley is notable as the terminus of the first railway electrification project in Sydney, which reached this station from Sydney Central in 1926.

In January 1946, the foreshore of Oatley Bay, near Russell Street, was the site of a horrific fatal shark attack, in shallow water.  Large sharks have been sighted in the shallow bay, many times over the years, and dogs have been taken. Swimmers at Oatley Park and the Oatley Pleasure Grounds are protected by shark-proof enclosures.

When a group gathered in Oatley Park in December 1959, to form a Bowling Club, it was inevitable that the founding members should choose a clock as the club emblem. The hands on the clock were set at 15 minutes after 10 - the precise time the first meeting of the Oatley Bowls Club was opened.<ref>The Book of Sydney Suburbs, Compiled by Frances Pollen, Angus & Robertson Publishers, 1990, Published in Australia , page 193</ref> The club has since closed, though the greens and Club premises remain.

The Oatley campus of Alexander Mackie College of Advanced Education opened in 1981 on the site of the former Judd's Brick Works and quarry. In 1981, when many teachers' colleges were amalgamated, it became The St George Institute of Education, part of Sydney College of Advanced Education, and subsequently a campus of the University of New South Wales. It is now a secondary school – the Oatley Senior Campus of the Georges River College.

 Local Industries 
Although now an entirely residential suburb, Oatley was the site of several industries in the past.

For over a century, Sydney Rock Oysters were grown commercially along the shores of Georges River at Oatley. Freshwater from the Woronora River, a tributary that joins the Georges River opposite Oatley, lowered salinity resulting in good-tasting oysters.

Six families of oyster farmers worked from the head of Neverfail Bay just to the east of the Como Railway Bridge There was a smaller oyster farming site at the head of Jewfish Bay just outside the eastern boundary of Oatley Park. Modern-day oyster shell 'middens' and a few decaying remnants of oyster farming still existed at these locations in 2021. Oysters were cultivated both on racks on the river mudbanks and, west of the Como rail bridge, on the rocks of shoreline leases. For many years, oysters were shipped to market in hessian sacks from Oatley railway station by electric rail parcel vans. There was also long-standing criminal activity involving the theft of oysters from the leases. Oyster farmers would at times patrol their leases at night, using boats fitted with small searchlights that could scan their shoreline leases.

This local oyster farming industry survived increasing urbanisation and water pollution but finally succumbed in the mid-1990s to the spread of 'QX disease', which is caused by a parasite that affects Sydney Rock Oysters.

Judd's Hurstville Brickworks was located on the northern side of Hurstville Road; its 13-hectare site straddled the northern boundary of Oatley with neighbouring Mortdale. It operated from 1884 to 1972, making bricks using shale from a quarry that occupied much of the Oatley-end of the site. Two tall brick chimneys were demolished in June 1973, along with the brick-making plant and kilns. Fifteen brick cottages were built along the western side of Judd Street, Oatley, to rent to workers at the brickworks; some still survive.

A factory owned by Albert Page, which once existed on the south-eastern corner of Rosa Street and Hurstville Road, manufactured vehicle number plates from 1935 to the 1950s. The Quill paper products factory was later on the same site. Surelli Furniture Pty Ltd operated a factory on the western side of Ada Street near the junction with Hurstville Road, until the late 1980s. Both these factory sites are now occupied by medium-density housing. The Cuthbertson family ran a small factory making children's and babies' shoes, behind their residence at 46 Rosa Street, from after WWI until 1959 when they moved the factory to a site in Mortdale.

 Heritage listings 
Oatley has a number of heritage-listed sites, including:
 Illawarra railway: Oatley railway station
 over Georges River: Old Como railway bridge
Residential building - 92 Rosa Street, Oatley.

Commercial area
The main shopping centre is located on Oatley Avenue and Frederick Street, near the railway station. A group of shops and a Coles Supermarket are located along the southern side of Mulga Road, between Waratah and Myall Streets, which are referred to as the Oatley West shops. A third group of shops at the intersection of Baker Street and Lansdowne Parade - in the locality of Jewfish Point - is now mainly converted to non-retail businesses. The village atmosphere, along with good cafes, and large parklands located in the centre of the shopping area adjacent to the train station, has led Oatley to be commonly mentioned as the most picturesque shopping village in the St George area.

Transport

Originally, the railway ran east of the present Mortdale Railway Sheds and down the western side of Oatley Avenue, on land that is now the Oatley Memorial Gardens.  The first station platform was located at the western end of Frederick Street and extended north to the Oatley Hotel car park. The railway was realigned and the current station opened in 1905. The electrification of the passenger network began in 1926 with the first suburban electric service running between Sydney's Central Station and the suburb of Oatley approximately 20 km south of Sydney.

Oatley railway station is the last station on the Sydney Trains Eastern Suburbs & Illawarra railway line before crossing the Georges River to Como in the Sutherland Shire. The 955 bus route operates a service from Mortdale through Oatley West and Oatley to Hurstville.

Parks
The area's main attraction is Oatley Park but there are also a number of local bush parks surrounding the suburb: Oatley Point Reserve, Oatley Pleasure Grounds, Moore Reserve, Renown Park, Lime Kiln Bay Bushland Sanctuary, Giriwa Picnic Ground, Stevens Reserve, Meyer Reserve, and the Myles Dunphy Bushland Reserve (in which foot tracks were improved in 2011, by Hurstville Council). They attract many birds both native and introduced, with Oatley Park alone recording 146 species; as many as 90 recently.Field, D. 21 August 2007. Ospreys spotted in Oatley and Lugarno The Leader, p9.

Oatley Park

Oatley Park is a tree covered promontory that is almost completely surrounded by the Georges River.

Oatley Park became a public recreation area on 25 March 1887. In October 1893, when the nearby residential subdivision was sold off, it was known as Peakhurst Park. It was renamed to Oatley Park in March 1922.

It protects important examples of the natural environment which occur throughout the park. In addition, there is a swimming area, a playground featuring an old steamroller, lookouts, barbecues, a soccer/cricket oval, and a "castle". The man-made wetlands of Lime Kiln Bay Reserve which adjoin Oatley Park provide refuge for bird species such as chestnut teal, Pacific black ducks, dusky moorhens and purple swamphens. Native mammals which are uncommon in the region can still be found within the park, including the short-beaked echidna and the swamp wallaby.Wallabies at Oatley Park, Oatley Flora and Fauna Conservarion Society, Inc

 Oatley Pleasure Grounds 

Oatley Pleasure Grounds is a bush park located on Annette Street. Numerous performances occurred in the park previously, and a wine bar was constructed. The bar was later shut down due to noise complaints.

Schools
 Oatley Public School
 Oatley West Public School
 St Joseph's Catholic School
 Georges River College Oatley Senior Campus

Churches
 All Saints' Anglican Church
 St Joseph's Catholic Church
 OAC Oatley Anglican Church
 Mortdale Oatley Baptist Church (MOBC)
 Oatley Uniting Church
 Oatley Christian Brethren Church
 Hurstville District Christadelphian Ecclesia

Landmarks
 Oatley RSL & Community Club 
 Oatley Clock Tower
 Oatley Bay, Gungah Bay, Lime Kiln Bay, Neverfail Bay, Jewfish Bay
 Oatley Point, Lime Kiln Point, Lime Kiln Head, Jewfish Bay Point
 Hills Lookout, Websters Lookout
 The Oatley Hotel (Oatley Pub)
 Oatley Library
 Myles Dunphy Reserve, a site of ecological significance. However, Hurstville City Council has plans to sell off a large part of this land to private business.
 The 1905 George Fincham Pipe Organ located at Hurstville Christadelphian District Ecclesia is a historically-significant musical instrument in the area.

Community events
 Oatley Lions Village Festival – An annual festival held on the third Saturday in October in Oatley Memorial Gardens and part of Frederick Street
 Oatley West Arts and Crafts Festival - An event held at Oatley West Public school each year
 Oatley Spring Fair – A fair held biennially at Oatley Public School

Sport
Water sports and recreation are a way of life in the peninsula suburb of Oatley whose eastern, southern and western boundaries are formed by the Georges River and its bays. Oatley has many sporting teams and sporting fields:
 Renown United, the local Rugby league team, play at Renown Park.
 Oatley Rugby Club, play Rugby Union at H.V Evatt Park in Lugarno.
 Oatley RSL, who play at Renown Park, and All Saints Oatley West, who play at Oatley Park, are the two association football teams.
 Oatley Netball Club.
 Oatley RSL Youth Club Gymnastics and Sport Aerobics

Population
Demographics
The next most common countries of birth were China 6.0%, England 2.9%, Hong Kong 1.3% and New Zealand 1.0%. 72.1% of people only spoke English at home. Other languages spoken at home included Mandarin 6.9%, Cantonese 3.4%, Greek 3.1%, Croatian 1.6% and Macedonian 1.3%. The most common responses for religious affiliation were Catholic 27.0%, No Religion 25.4%, Anglican 16.6% and Eastern Orthodox 6.6%.

Notable residents
 Myles Joseph Dunphy (1891-1985) - architect and conservationist
Milo Kanangra Dunphy (1928-1996), the son of Myles Dunphy, and also an architect and conservationist.
 Fiona Margaret Hall - an artistic photographer and sculptor.
 Ian McNamara - radio presenter, grew up in Oatley and attended Oatley West Public School.
 John O'Grady (writer) - humorist and author of They're a Weird Mob.
 Adrian Hooper - conductor and mandolinist.

References

Bibliography
 Sands and MacDougall Post Office Directory of Sydney'' (various years)

External links

 Oatley Park Plan of Management 24 November 2004
 Oatley Park.
 Funds bypass station - Local News - News - General - St George & Sutherland Shire Leader
 Oatley Flora and Fauna Conservation Society
 Oatley Heritage and Historical  Society
 Georges River Council
 NSW Heritage Office 
 Oatley Dictionary of Sydney
 Neverfail Bay, Oatley Dictionary of Sydney
 Oatley Park Baths Dictionary of Sydney

Suburbs of Sydney
Georges River Council